Eddie is a 1996 American sports comedy film starring Whoopi Goldberg and Frank Langella. The film was directed by Steve Rash.

Plot
The New York Knicks are also-rans in the NBA, their roster filled with players who either lack talent or are too distracted by off-the-court issues. Nonetheless, limousine driver and rabid fan Edwina "Eddie" Franklin attends every Knicks game in the nosebleed section of Madison Square Garden.

During halftime of a game, Eddie is one of three fans picked to win a chance to be the honorary assistant coach of the Knicks for the second half by sinking a free throw, which she does. She quickly gets on the nerves of head coach John Bailey, whom she had heckled earlier.

Eddie is eventually charged with a technical foul for stepping onto the court during an argument between Bailey and a referee, and she is ejected from the Garden, to the fans' dismay. Eddie's popularity piques the interest of the new Knicks owner, "Wild Bill" Burgess. After he forces Bailey to quit, Burgess names Eddie the new head coach.

The decision is received with skepticism and derision. However, she eventually is able to connect with the players both off and on the court to earn their respect. Eddie is able to lead the Knicks into postseason contention; the winner of their game against the Charlotte Hornets, now coached by Bailey, will receive the final spot in the NBA playoffs.

The night before the game, Burgess tells Eddie that if the Knicks win this game, he plans to sell the team to someone who intends to move the team to St. Louis. A conflicted Eddie must decide what to do when the Knicks take a one-point lead with just a few seconds to play. Realizing the consequences, she stops the game to announce Burgess's plan to the crowd at the Garden.

Faced with the possible enormous backlash from the Knicks' fans, Burgess promises the crowd he won't sell the team or move them out of New York City. When play resumes, the Hornets have one last chance to win, but Larry Johnson commits a charge on the game-winning layup, nullifying the basket and giving the Knicks the victory and the playoff berth.

Cast

 Whoopi Goldberg as Edwina "Eddie" Franklin
 Frank Langella as William "Wild Bill" Burgess
 Dennis Farina as Coach John Bailey
 Richard Jenkins as Carl Zimmer
 Lisa Ann Walter as Claudine
 John Benjamin Hickey as Joe Nader
 John Salley as Nate Wilson
 Mark Jackson as Darren "Preachor" Taylor
 Malik Sealy as Stacy Patton
 Dwayne Schintzius as Ivan Radovadovitch
 Rick Fox as Terry Hastings
 Greg Ostertag as Joe Sparks
 Vernel Singleton as Jamal Duncan
 John DiMaggio as construction worker

Players from several NBA teams played major roles, including Alex English as the Cleveland Cavaliers' coach, Dwayne Schintzius, Greg Ostertag, and Rick Fox.  Dennis Rodman, Muggsy Bogues, Vinny Del Negro, Vlade Divac, Bobby Phills, J. R. Reid, Terrell Brandon, Brad Daugherty, Mitch Richmond, Avery Johnson, Corie Blount, Larry Johnson, Randy Brown, Olden Polynice, and Scott Burrell appeared as themselves.  Gary Payton, Anthony Mason, Herb Williams, and John Starks appeared as streetballers.  Kurt Rambis appeared as the head coach of the Lakers. Chris Berman, Marv Albert and Walt Frazier also appeared in the movie as broadcasters.

Donald Trump, Rudy Giuliani, Ed Koch, Fabio, and David Letterman also appeared in the movie. Gene Anthony Ray (who played Leroy in both Fame the series and the 1980 film) also features as associate choreographer, one of his last credits before his death in 2003.

Reception 
On Rotten Tomatoes the film holds an approval rating of 16% based on 37 reviews, with an average rating of 4/10. The website's critics consensus reads: "Whoopi Goldberg may demonstrate that she can coach a basketball team with the best of them, but not even she can whip this dreary script into shape." Audiences polled by CinemaScore gave the film an average grade of "A−" on an A+ to F scale.

Roger Ebert gave the film one and a half stars. Whoopi Goldberg was nominated for a Razzie Award as Worst Actress for her performance.

Soundtrack

A soundtrack containing hip hop and R&B music was released on May 21, 1996 by Island Black Music in conjunction with Hollywood Records. It peaked at 119 on the Billboard 200 and 44 on the Top R&B/Hip-Hop Albums.

Notes
Principal photography commenced on August 9, 1995 and ended on October 12. Co-stars Langella and Goldberg became romantically involved and started divorce proceedings against their respective spouses within two weeks of each other. They lived together until February 2000, when Goldberg asked Langella to move out of her main house and into the guesthouse; on March 7, she asked him to leave the guesthouse, and he did.

References

External links
 
 
 

1996 films
1990s sports comedy films
Adultery in films
American basketball films
American sports comedy films
Films scored by Stanley Clarke
Films about women's sports
Films directed by Steve Rash
Films set in New York City
Films shot in New York City
Films shot in North Carolina
Films shot in Texas
Hollywood Pictures films
PolyGram Filmed Entertainment films
New York Knicks
African-American comedy films
1996 comedy films
Cultural depictions of Vlade Divac
1990s English-language films
1990s American films
Films about National Basketball Association